The  Green Bay Packers season was their 49th season overall and their 47th season in the National Football League (NFL) and resulted in a 9–4–1 record and a victory in Super Bowl II. The team beat the Dallas Cowboys in the NFL Championship Game, a game commonly known as the "Ice Bowl," which marked the second time the Packers had won an NFL-record third consecutive NFL championship, having also done so in 1931 under team founder Curly Lambeau. In the playoff era (since 1933), it remains the only time a team has won three consecutive NFL titles.

The Packers were led by ninth-year head coach Vince Lombardi and veteran quarterback Bart Starr, in his twelfth season. Green Bay's victory in Super Bowl II over the Oakland Raiders was the fifth world championship for the Packers under Lombardi and the last game he coached for the Packers.

The 1967 Packers became the first team in NFL history to win three consecutive championship games, and the second team in NFL history to three-peat as champions to the 1929-1931 Green Bay Packers. No team has won three championships in a row since.

Offseason

NFL draft 

In the first round of the 1967 NFL/AFL draft in March, the Packers selected guard Bob Hyland and quarterback Don Horn.This was the first common draft with the AFL, following the merger agreement of the previous June.

Expansion draft 
One of the players that Lombardi left unprotected was a future hall of famer, halfback Paul Hornung. Lombardi was distraught when the Saints selected Hornung in the draft. In later years, Hornung revealed that he spoke to Saints coach Tom Fears prior to the draft. Fears was a former assistant in Green Bay and Fears felt that Hornung would help sell tickets in New Orleans. Several weeks later, the Saints also signed Jim Taylor, the Packers fullback. Taylor, a Louisiana native and future hall of famer, had felt underpaid and underappreciated under Lombardi.

Preseason

Regular season 
The Packers finished the regular season 9–4–1. The  NFL season saw the addition of a sixteenth team and the two conferences of eight teams each were subdivided into two divisions. The Packers played in the Western Conference and in the Central Division, with the Lions, Bears, and Vikings; each division foe was played twice, and each team in the Century Division and Coastal Division was played once (and no teams in the Capitol Division). Each of the four division winners advanced to the playoffs.

The Packers clinched the Central division title at Wrigley Field on November 26 at 8–2–1, with three games remaining, as the second-place Chicago Bears fell to 5–6. With the rotational system (in place until ), they had home field advantage for the playoffs in 1967, with the first round (conference) scheduled at Milwaukee against the Coastal division champion.

Schedule 

 
Note: Intra-division opponents are in bold text.

Game summaries

Week 1

Week 2 vs Bears

Week 3

Week 4

Week 5

Week 6

Week 7

Week 8

Week 9

Week 10

Week 11

Week 12

Week 13

Week 14

Standings

Postseason

Western Conference Championship 

The Green Bay Packers defeated the Los Angeles Rams 28–7 on December 23, 1967, at Milwaukee County Stadium, in Milwaukee, Wisconsin. The Rams scored the first points of the game on a 29-yard pass from Roman Gabriel. The Packers scored the next four touchdowns, including two touchdown runs by Travis Williams. With the win the Packers advanced to the NFL Championship game.

NFL Championship (Ice Bowl) 

The Packers advanced to the NFL Championship game and faced the Dallas Cowboys in the NFL Championship Game. The game was played on December 31, 1967, at Lambeau Field in Green Bay, Wisconsin. The bitter cold overwhelmed Lambeau Field's new turf heating system, leaving the playing surface hard as a rock and nearly as smooth as ice. The officials were unable to use their whistles after the opening kickoff when a whistle stuck to a referee's lips.

Early in the game, the Packers jumped to a 14–0 lead with a pair of touchdown passes from Bart Starr to wide receiver Boyd Dowler. Green Bay committed two costly turnovers in the second quarter that led to ten Dallas points. Neither team was able to score any points in the third quarter, but then on the first play of the final period, the Cowboys took a 17–14 lead with running back Dan Reeves' 50-yard touchdown pass to wide receiver Lance Rentzel on a halfback option play.

Starting from his own 32-yard line with 4:54 left in the game, Starr led his team down the field to the one-yard line. Running back Donny Anderson attempted two runs into the end zone, but fell short. Facing a third down with sixteen seconds left in the game, Starr executed a quarterback sneak behind center Ken Bowman and guard Jerry Kramer's block through defensive tackle Jethro Pugh, scoring a touchdown that gave the Packers a 21–17 win and their unprecedented third consecutive NFL championship.

Super Bowl II 

After beating the Cowboys in the NFL Championship game, the Packers advanced to the AFL-NFL World Championship Game to face the American Football League champions, the Oakland Raiders. The Packers scored early with two field goals from kicker Don Chandler. Later in the second quarter, quarterback Bart Starr threw a 62-yard touchdown pass to receiver Boyd Dowler to give the Packers a 13–0 lead. Oakland struck back on their next possession when quarterback Daryle Lamonica completed a 23-yard touchdown pass to receiver Bill Miller. At the end of the half, Don Chandler added another field goal, making the score 16–7.

In the second half, Starr completed a 35-yard pass to receiver Max McGee, which was the last reception of McGee's career. The pass helped set up Donny Anderson's two-yard touchdown run. Early in the fourth quarter, Chandler kicked his fourth field goal, making the score 26–7. After the field goal, Starr was injured on a sack and was replaced by Zeke Bratkowski. Later in the fourth quarter, Packers defensive back Herb Adderley intercepted a Raiders pass and returned it 60 yards for a touchdown, making the score 33–7. The Raiders managed to score a second touchdown on a 23-yard touchdown pass from Lamonica to Bill Miller late in the fourth quarter. The Packers went on to win the game 33–14. Coaching his last game for the Packers, Vince Lombardi was carried off the field in victory.

Season statistical leaders 
 Passing yards: Bart Starr, 1823
 Passing touchdowns: Bart Starr, 9
 Rushing yards: Jim Grabowski, 466
 Rushing touchdowns: Elijah Pitts and Donny Anderson, 7
 Receiving yards: Boyd Dowler, 836
 Receiving touchdowns: Carroll Dale, 5
 Points: Don Chandler, 96
 Kickoff return yards: Travis Williams, 533
 Punt return yards: Donny Anderson, 98
 Interceptions: Bob Jeter, 8

Roster

Coaching staff

References

External links 
 1967 Packers at Database Football
 1967 Packers at Pro-football-reference
 1967 Packers at The packers to win the 1936, 1939, and 1944 championships

Green Bay Packers
National Football League championship seasons
Green Bay Packers seasons
Super Bowl champion seasons
Green